is a railway station in the city of Handa, Aichi Prefecture, Japan, operated by Central Japan Railway Company (JR Tōkai).  It is also a freight terminal for the Kinuura Rinkai Railway.

Lines
Higashi-Narawa Station is served by the Taketoyo Line, and is located 16.3 kilometers from the starting point of the line at Ōbu Station.

Station layout
The station  has a single island platforms connected to the station building by a level crossing. The station has automated ticket machines, TOICA automated turnstiles and is unattended.

Platforms

Adjacent stations

|-
!colspan=5|Central Japan Railway Company

Station history
Higashi-Narawa Station opened on 1 March 1933, as a passenger station on the Japanese Government Railways (JGR). Freight operations commenced from 1 May 1945. The JGR became the Japanese National Railways (JNR) after World War II. Freight operations were discontinued from 15 November 1975, and the station became unattended after that time. With the privatization and dissolution of the JNR on 1 April 1987, the station came under the control of JR Central. Automatic turnstiles were installed in May 1992, and the TOICA system of magnetic fare cards was implemented in November 2006. 

The freight-only Kinuura Rinkai Railway Handa Line opened on 15 November 1975.

Station numbering was introduced to the Taketoyo Line in March 2018; Higashi-Narawa Station was assigned station number CE08.

Passenger statistics
In fiscal 2018, the station was used by an average of 615 passengers daily (boarding passengers only).

Surrounding area
JFE Steel - Chita plant

See also
 List of Railway Stations in Japan

References

External links

Railway stations in Japan opened in 1933
Railway stations in Aichi Prefecture
Taketoyo Line
Stations of Central Japan Railway Company
Handa, Aichi